This was the first edition of the tournament.

Gerard Granollers and Guillermo Olaso won the title after defeating Scott Clayton and Jonny O'Mara 6–1, 7–5 in the final.

Seeds

Draw

References
 Main Draw

Glasgow Trophy - Doubles
2018 Doubles